Monomakhovichi or House of Monomakh was a major princely branch of the Rurik dynasty, descendants of which managed to inherit many princely titles which originated in Kievan Rus'. The progenitor of the house is Vladimir II Monomakh (son of Vsevolod). The name derived from the grandfather of Vladimir, Constantine IX Monomachos.

Due to its dominance and conflicts within itself, the branch was subdivided into three major factions: the sons of Mstislav I of Kiev, Izyaslavichi and Rostislavichi; and the sons of Yuri Dolgorukiy, Yurievichi. The split occurred in the 12th century. By that time, Kievan Rus' has already lost its control over the Principality of Polotsk (Iziaslavichi, later Vseslavichi) and the Principality of Halych (Romanovichi), which were self-governed by other branches of the Rurikid dynasty. The Monomakhovichi were in conflict with these branches.

Main branches
 Mstislavichi (Mstislav I of Kiev)
Shakhovskoy (Dmitry Shakhovskoy)
 Volhynia (Iziaslav II of Kiev)
 Rostislavichi of Smolensk (Rostislav I of Kiev)
 Romanovichi of Halych (Roman the Great)
 Yuryevichi of Vladimir-Suzdal (Yuri Dolgorukiy)
 Iziaslavichi / Vseslavichi of Polotsk
Lobanov-Rostovsky (Nikita Lobanov-Rostovsky)
 Gagarin of Starodub (Andrey Gagarin)
Khilkov of Starodub

Yurievichi branch 

The Yurievichi branch (named after Yuri Dolgorukiy) would reign in Muscovy and the Tsardom of Russia until the 1598 death of Feodor I caused the Time of Troubles. The lineage from Yuri Dolgorukiy onwards is given in the table below:

References

External links
 Voytovych, L. Princely dynasties of Eastern Europe: composition, social and political role. Historical-Genealogical research. Lviv, 2000

1113 establishments in Europe
1598 disestablishments in Europe